Nebraska Highway 87 is a highway in northwestern Nebraska.  It has a southern terminus at Nebraska Highway 2 in Alliance.  Its northern terminus is at the South Dakota border where it continues in northward as South Dakota Highway 407.

Route description
Nebraska Highway 87 begins at an intersection with NE 2 in Alliance. It heads in a northerly direction before turning to the northeast through farmland. It turns northward again before heading into Hay Springs. Just outside Rushville, US 20 and NE 87 split and NE 87 heads northward. It turns to the northwest slightly before heading directly northward into Whiteclay. It then terminates at the border with South Dakota, where it continues as SD 407.

Major intersections

References

External links

Nebraska Roads: NE 81-100

087
Transportation in Box Butte County, Nebraska
Transportation in Sheridan County, Nebraska